Ch'iqlla (Quechua for tadpole, also spelled Chijlla) is a  mountain in Bolivia. It is located in the Potosí Department, Sud Lípez Province, San Pablo de Lípez Municipality. Ch'iqlla lies between the Ch'iqu volcano in the north and Laguna Colorada in the south.

References 

Mountains of Potosí Department